Charles B. Hensley is an American businessman. In 1997 he invented and developed Zicam, a patent medicine for the common cold.

Business ventures and legal issues

Pharmaceuticals
In 1997 he invented and developed Zicam, a patent medicine for the common cold.

In 2001 he formed PRB Pharmaceuticals, Inc. to develop Antiviral drugs aimed at emerging viral disease. In 2011, after a six-year investigation into its CHINA/US relationships, the company was charged with federal violations. Subsequently, all charges save one misdemeanor were dropped.

Desilu 
In 2016 Hensley and his partners acquired the registered trademark for Desilu, Lucille Ball and Desi Arnaz's defunct production company. In 2018 Desilu Studios filed a trademark infringement lawsuit against CBS over the Desilu mark. CBS subsequently filed a counter suit against Hensley, Desilu Corporation and Desilu Studios.

On August 10, 2022, federal prosecutors in Los Angeles indicted Hensley on fraud and identity theft charges, alleging he used the Desilu name to scam investors. Hensley has been charged with 11 counts of wire fraud and one count of aggravated identity theft. Prosecutors said Hensley collected $331,000 from investors, money that was used for his personal expenses including trips to Las Vegas.

References

American health care chief executives
Film producers from California
Businesspeople from Los Angeles
University of Southern California alumni
Living people
1953 births